The 2022–23 UTSA Roadrunners men's basketball team represented the University of Texas at San Antonio in the 2022–23 NCAA Division I men's basketball season. The Roadrunners, led by seventh-year head coach Steve Henson, played their home games at the Convocation Center in San Antonio, Texas as a member of Conference USA.

The season marks the team's last season as members of Conference USA before joining the American Athletic Conference on July 1, 2023.

Previous season
The Roadrunners finished the 2021–22 season 10–22, 3–15 in C-USA play to finish in sixth place in the West Division. They lost in the first round of the C-USA Tournament to Southern Miss.

Offseason

Departures

Incoming transfers

2022 recruiting class

Roster

Schedule and results

|-
!colspan=9 style=| Exhibition

|-
!colspan=9 style=| Non-conference regular season

|-
!colspan=9 style=| Conference USA regular season

|-
!colspan=9 style=| Conference USA tournament

Source

See also
 2022–23 UTSA Roadrunners women's basketball team

References

UTSA Roadrunners men's basketball seasons
UTSA Roadrunners
UTSA Roadrunners men's basketball
UTSA Roadrunners men's basketball